Crows Nest Branch Railway was originally surveyed as a direct line from Toowoomba north to Crows Nest in Queensland, Australia.  The branch eventually took a more circuitous route to cover the maximum amount of farming country.  The first stage struck out from Pengarry Junction a short distance west of Toowoomba and continued via Birnan, Cawdor, Shirley, Woolmer, Meringandan and Kleinton to terminate at Cabarlah.  It opened on 17 September 1883.  Shortly after opening, a daily service was provided to Cabarlah.

The second stage of the line to Crows Nest was opened on 6 December 1886 and stops were located en route at Geham, Mt Luke, Taylor, Hampton and Pechey.  The extension serviced sawmills in the Pechey and Perseverance regions with a
siding at Hampton station connecting to the Munro Tramway servicing Palmtree, Perseverance and Ravensbourne.

Until about 1930, a daily mixed train departed Crows Nest at 7.00am each morning except Sunday for the 3-hour trip to Toowoomba.  A rail motor service then took over which cut the travel time to a little over 1 hours.  The branch was relegated to goods trains only during the mid-1950s and closed completely on 1 July 1961.

See also

 Rail transport in Queensland

References 

 "Triumph of Narrow Gauge: A History of Queensland Railways". John Kerr. 1990. Boolarong Press, Brisbane.

External links
 1925 map of the Queensland railway system

Closed railway lines in Queensland
Railway lines opened in 1883
Railway lines closed in 1961
Darling Downs
1883 establishments in Australia
1961 disestablishments in Australia